The 102nd Michigan Legislature, consisting of the Michigan Senate and the Michigan House of Representatives, is set to meet beginning in January 1, 2023 and end on December 31, 2024.

Members in both the House of Representatives and Senate were elected in the 2022 election. It will be the first time that Democrats have held both houses of the legislature and the governorship since the 82nd Michigan Legislature in 1983-1984, the first time that Democrats have held the majority in the House since 2008, and the first time Democrats have held the majority in the Senate since 1984. It will also be the first legislature whose districts were drawn by the Michigan Independent Citizens Redistricting Commission, which was created through the passage of 2018 Michigan Proposal 2, based on the results of the 2020 United States census and the resulting redistricting cycle.

Membership

Leadership 

 House
 Speaker-designate: State Rep. Joe Tate
 Speaker pro tempore-designate: State Rep.  Laurie Pohutsky
 Associate Speaker Pro Tem.: state Rep. Carol Glanville
 Associate Speaker Pro Tem.: state Rep. Kristian Grant
 Majority Floor Leader: State Rep. Abraham Aiyash
 Assistant Majority Floor Leaders: state Reps. Kara Hope, Jimmie Wilson Jr. and Betsy Coffia
 Majority Whip: state Rep. Ranjeev Puri 
 Deputy Whips: state Reps. Carrie Rheingans and Alabas Farhat 
 Majority Caucus Chair: state Rep. Amos O’Neal 
 Majority Caucus Vice Chairs: state Reps. Helena Scott, Brenda Carter and Jasper Martus
 Minority Leader: State Rep. Matt Hall
 assistant assistant leader: Rep. Andrew Beeler   
 minority floor leader: Rep. Bryan Posthumus
 minority Whip: Rep. Sarah Lightner  
 minority Caucus chair: Rep. Ken Borton 
 minority caucus’ vice chair: Rep. Jamie Green 
 Clerk: TBD
 Sergeant-at-arms: TBD
 Senate
 Senate President: Lt. Gov. Garlin Gilchrist
 Senate president pro tempore-designate: State Sen. Jeremy Moss
 Majority Leader: State Sen. Winnie Brinks
 Assistant Majority Leader: State Sen. Darrin Camilleri
 Majority Floor Leader: Rep. Sam Singh
 Majority Caucus Chair: State Sen. Dayna Polehanki
 Majority Policy and Steering Chair: State Sen. Stephanie Chang
 Majority Whip: State Sen Mallory McMorrow
 Minority Leader: State Sen. Aric Nesbitt
 minority floor leader: Sen. Dan Lauwers 
 minority caucus whip: Sen. Roger Victory
 minority caucus chair: Sen. Kevin Daley
 assistant minority leader: Sen. Rick Outman
 assistant minority floor leader: Sen. Lana Theis
 Clerk: TBD
 Sergeant-at-arms: TBD

Joe Tate is set to become the first African American speaker of the House, and Winnie Brinks to become the first woman majority leader of the Senate. Jeremy Moss is set to become the first LGBT person to serve as Senate president pro tempore.

Legislation 
Members of the incoming Democratic majority have announced their intent to pursue the following:

 repeal of Right-to-work law
 expansion of the Elliott-Larsen Civil Rights Act to include sexual orientation, gender identity, hair style and texture, and more
 Repeal of Act 328, which bans abortion, homosexuality, adultery and other behaviors
 increasing gun safety measures

References 

Michigan legislative sessions
2023 U.S. legislative sessions